The 1919 Villanova Wildcats football team represented the Villanova University during the 1919 college football season. The Wildcats team captain was Hugh McGeehan.

Schedule

References

Villanova
Villanova Wildcats football seasons
Villanova Wildcats football